Bocanada (Puff) is the second solo album by Argentine rock musician Gustavo Cerati, released by BMG International on 28 June 1999. The album, an eclectic mix of neo-psychedelia and trip hop with a variety of styles, is considered by critics and fans as a highlight in Cerati's career and one of his best albums. His first album release after the breakup of Soda Stereo, Bocanada followed Cerati's time with the groups Plan V and Ocio, two bands oriented towards electronic music. Raíz was the album's first cut played in radio stations, Puente being the first music video to be released; "Bocanada" had the most music videos produced of any Cerati album to date.

Music
Bocanada is mostly an electronic music album, with an art pop and trip hop sound, making a huge change of Cerati's classic pop rock sound and influences. Similar to other artists of trip hop scene like Massive Attack or Portishead, several songs use one or more samples.

Track listing
All songs written by Gustavo Cerati, except where noted.

Videos

This is the album which has the most music videos released in Gustavo Cerati's soloist career.

 Puente .
 Paseo Inmoral .
 Tabú .
 Engaña .
 Río Babel .

Personnel

 Gustavo Cerati - lead vocals, guitars, samplers, synthesizers, keyboards, bass guitar, effects, additional instruments, mixing, producer

Additional personnel
 Flavius Etcheto: Sampler in all tracks minus Raiz and Verbo Carne.
 Leo García: Sampler, Backing Vocals in Engaña, Puente and Aqui y Ahora.
 Martín Carrizo: drums.
 Fernando Nalé: Bass guitar in 4, 6, 11. Double Bass in 3, 5. Fretless bass in 13.
 Tweety González: Organ in Beautiful.
 Alejandro Terán: Arranger in Verbo Carne.
 Eduardo Bergallo: Engineer, mixing
 MacKinlay: 2nd Engineer
 Eduardo Iencenella: Assistant
 Clive Goddard: Mixing
 Barry Woodward: Editor, The Townhouse, London
 Bunt Stafford-Clark: Mastering, The Townhouse, London
 Gaby Herbstein: Photography 
 Oscar (Roho): Hairstyle
 Sofía Temperley: Photoshop
 ROS: Design direction
The London Session Orchestra
 Gavin Wright: Director
 Peter Cobbin: Engineer
 Joel Gregg: Assistant

Certifications

References

Gustavo Cerati albums
1999 albums
Bertelsmann Music Group albums